Jonny Vang is a Norwegian film from 2003. It was directed by Jens Lien after a script by Ståle Stein Berg. The music was composed by the band Calexico. The plot is a drama-comedy from the Norwegian countryside, where the protagonist Jonny Vang is frustrated in his efforts to prosper as a breeder of earthworms. The film was reasonably well received by critics, and was awarded an Amanda Award for "Best Actor" in 2003.

Plot

Jonny Vang (Aksel Hennie) lives on the Norwegian countryside, where he is trying to establish a business breeding earthworms. His ambitions to expand are thwarted by the bank manager (Trond Brænne), who will not lend him the necessary money. He lives with his mother Brita (Marit Andreassen) and her difficult friend Odvar (Bjørn Sundquist). On top of all of this, he is also carrying out an affair with Tuva (Laila Goody)the wife of his best friend Magnus (Fridtjov Såheim). Things get even worse when an unknown assailant knocks him over the head with a shovel.

Cast
Jonny Vang -  Aksel Hennie
Tuva -  Laila Goody
Magnus - Fridtjov Såheim
Brita -  Marit Andreassen
Odvar - Bjørn Sundquist
Police Officer - Nils Vogt
Gunnar - Anders Ødegård
Helene - Silje Salomonsen
Bank manager -  Trond Brænne

Production 
Jonny Vang was director Jens Lien's debut as a feature film director. Lien had previously established himself as a director of television advertisements. He had also been represented twice at the Cannes International Film Festival, with short films. He described the film as "a drama comedy, a juicy story, life, lust and rock 'n' roll. It's a dead serious comedy".

Lien originally considered Hennie too young for the role, but the actor was persistent, and finally persuaded the director that he was the right man for the part. The movie, where the story takes place in Gudbrandsdalen, was filmed in the town of Fåvang.

To get Calexico's permission to use their music in the film, Lien had to travel to the U.S. in person. He brought with him an unfinished version of the film, but the only place where he could play the VHS tape was at a nearby rental store, where 30 customers joined the band and the director, who had to simultaneously translate the plot. The music is a mix of traditional American and Mexican music, and is gathered from the band's albums Spoke (1997), The Black Light (1998) and Hot Rail (2000).

Reception 

Jonny Vang was reasonably well received by the Norwegian press. The newspaper Dagbladet gave the film four out of six points, and commended it for good scenes, yet found it somewhat predictable. The reviewer mentioned Calexico's soundtrack as one of the best parts of the movie. Aftenposten'''s Per Haddal awarded five out of six points, and believed the movie was a well functional comedy. Also Haddal commended the choice of music.

International reviewers were less enthusiastic. Variety complimented the actors' performances, but found that the movie did not "have a great deal of drive or momentum". The reviewer at the Swedish website "DVD forum" jokingly said that he laughed often, so he hoped it was a comedy. Generally content with the movie, he found Hennie's performance somewhat "theatrical".

Aksel Hennie was awarded an Amanda Award for "Best Actor" for his effort in the film in 2003. The movie was also nominated in the category "Best Film", but lost out to Bent Hamer's Salmer fra kjøkkenet''. Hennie also won the "Best Actor" award at the Brussels European Film Festival.

References

External links
 
 

2003 films
2003 comedy-drama films
Norwegian comedy-drama films
2000s Norwegian-language films